Edstone  is a civil parish in the Ryedale district of the county of North Yorkshire, England, the principal settlement in which is the village of Great Edstone. Edstone has a population of 217 according to the 2011 census.

Places of interest
The nearest schools to Edstone are: Welburn Hall School (1.4 miles), Kirkbymoorside Community Primary School (1.4 miles) and Ryedale School (3.1 miles).

The North York Moors national park is located 2 miles to the north of Edstone village.

Beginning
The hill upon which Great Edstone was built was formed by glaciers in about 30,000 BC. While the Ice Age melted, the hill was left to be an island in the middle of a lake which covered the Vale of Pickering – which itself receded once all trace of the Ice Age left. When the ice did melt, the fertile soils of the land are likely to have encouraged farming.

History
The name 'Edstone' has an original meaning when broken down into old English which is: "Eadin's farm/settlement."

In 1870–72, John Marius Wilson's Imperial Gazetteer of England and Wales described Edstone as

Great Edstone was a key place for evacuees to stay during the Second World War, as can be seen in the still-remaining village hall. In the 1970s–80s the school was removed, since there were not enough children in the village. Since then, the village has decreased in size, and presently all that remains is about 30–50 houses, a church, a village hall, a post box and a telephone box. However the village continues to grow in population as new houses are built, and it has recently seen an increase in the number of young families.

The major residential street of Great Edstone is the Wapping, upon which many of the houses are built. Throughout the area, the feeling of community is strong, and people do tend to help each other wherever possible. The church is open regularly and really is worth a view, while the views from the door are breathtaking.

The parish was formed on 1 April 1986 from "Great Edstone" and "Little Edstone".

St Michael and All Angels Church, Great Edstone
Information on the church:

The church is an ancient structure, but the numerous modern repairs have removed all traces of its early architecture.

Population
According to the latest census of 2011 it has a population of 217 residents. The population has increased from the 2001 census, when the population was 192.

This population graph shows an overall increase over 130 years from 1881 to 2011 in terms of the number of residents that have moved into the village of Edstone. However, the most noticeable difference being within a 50-year time period, from 1961 where the population rapidly increased from 113 residents to 217 residents in 2011 (Census data) an overall increase of 105 inhabitants. Although, prior to the 1961 population of Edstone, the general trend saw the population decrease by 89 residents from 1821 to 1921.

Buildings and features
The most prominent and perhaps the oldest building is The Manor House, a house visible from many miles away.

References

External links

 Great Edstone village website

Civil parishes in North Yorkshire
Ryedale